The Gere Bank Building is a five-story building located on Water Street in Syracuse, New York.  It was designed by Charles Colton, and built in 1894.  It is distinctive for its facade and use of contrasting materials.  The cost of the building was $150,000, including nearly $50,000 for fireproof vaults in a room beneath the sidewalk.  The building was added to the National Register of Historic Places in 1972.  It is part of the Hanover Square Historic District.  In the warm weather months, entertainment is common on the plaza around the fountain.  Workers in the surrounding office buildings and retail establishments often lunch there.

References

External links

Bank buildings on the National Register of Historic Places in New York (state)
Commercial buildings completed in 1894
Buildings and structures in Syracuse, New York
National Register of Historic Places in Syracuse, New York